A pisanie is an architectural elements, that consists of an inscription carved in stone, wood, metal, painted, etc., on the top of tombs or above the main door at the entrance in a church, in which are recorded information about the church, the donator, the founder, the builder, the data when the church was built etc. The inscription usually includes a religious invocation, the name of the founder or founders, the date of construction, the motivation of the building, the circumstances of the time and other data.

The term comes from the Church Slavonic language and many churches and monasteries have the inscription written using the Cyrillic script.

Gallery

Notes

External links 

Architectural elements